Henry Corden (born Henry Cohen; January 6, 1920 – May 19, 2005) was a Canadian-born American actor, best known for taking over the role of Fred Flintstone after Alan Reed's death in 1977. His official debut as Fred's new voice was in the 1965 Hanna-Barbera record, Saving Mr. Flintstone, although he had previously provided the singing voice for Reed in the 1966 theatrical film The Man Called Flintstone and the Hanna-Barbera specials Alice in Wonderland or What's a Nice Kid Like You Doing in a Place Like This? (1966) and Energy: A National Issue (1977). He took over the role as Fred Flintstone full time starting with the syndicated weekday series Fred Flintstone and Friends for which he provided voice-overs on brief bumper clips shown in-between segments.

Early years
Corden was born in Montreal to Max and Emma Cohen. His father was a meat curer who had been born in Romania; his mother was originally from Russia. The family moved to the Bronx, New York when Corden was a child and he arrived in Hollywood in the 1940s.

Career 
He appeared on the stage in Los Angeles and Hollywood, including a 1947 production of The Message. His film career included The System (1952), where he played a near-sighted gangster named Specs. Corden thought it would be the first time in 25 films he could wear his glasses and see while he was acting, but the lenses gave off too much reflection and he had to substitute them for plain glass after one day of shooting.

Corden's obituary in the Tampa Bay Times noted, "With his deep voice, jet-black hair and ethnic looks, Corden was frequently tapped to play heavies in films and on television."[2] He can be seen in such live-action films as The Secret Life of Walter Mitty, The Black Castle, Abbott and Costello in the Foreign Legion and The Ten Commandments. He also appeared in dozens of TV shows, including Hogan's Heroes (in five episodes), Dragnet, Perry Mason, Peter Gunn, McHale's Navy (in five episodes), Gunsmoke, The Mary Tyler Moore Show and was a regular on The Jerry Lewis Show. Corden was on Wagon Train, S3 E23, The Alexander Portlass Story (portrayed by Peter Lorre) as Phelan, one of Alexander’s crew.  Corden also played landlord Henry Babbitt on The Monkees and Mr. Haskell, the owner of an ice cream parlor, in an episode of The Brady Bunch.

Before Reed's death, Corden had been used as Reed's replacement when Fred Flintstone had to sing because Reed could not sing on pitch. Corden gave his voice to a number of Hanna-Barbera productions besides The Flintstones, including The Jetsons, Josie and the Pussycats, The Atom Ant Show, The New Tom & Jerry Show and Jonny Quest. Corden also gave voice to the wizard Gemini and Ookla the Mokk in Ruby-Spears Productions' Thundarr the Barbarian as well as the Gorilla General Urko in DePatie-Freleng Enterprises' Return to the Planet of the Apes. He voiced Arnie Barkley, the Archie Bunker-inspired patriarch of DePatie-Freleng's The Barkleys, in 1972.

Personal life
Corden was married four times. His first wife was Thelma Corden, from 1942 to 1969; together they had two children. He and his second wife Shirley W. Cytron were married from 1970 to 1979. After his divorce from Cytron, he married his third wife Charlotte R. Colton Diamond in 1984; they remained married until her death in 1993. Corden married his fourth and final wife Angelina Corden in 1995, and they remained married until Corden's death in 2005.

Death
On May 19, 2005, Corden died of emphysema at Sherman Oaks Hospital in Sherman Oaks, California. He was 85 years old. Corden's wife of nine years, Angelina, was with him at the time.

His interment was at San Fernando Mission Cemetery.

Filmography

Film

The Secret Life of Walter Mitty (1947) as Hendrick
Bride of Vengeance (1949) as Scout
Wild Weed (1949) as Hugo the club manager
Abbott and Costello in the Foreign Legion (1950) as Ibrim 
The Asphalt Jungle (1950) as William Dolden
Hiawatha (1952) as Ottobang
Abbott and Costello Meet Dr. Jekyll and Mr. Hyde (1953) as Actor in Javanese Costume (uncredited)
The Band Wagon (1953) as Orchestra leader (uncredited)
Phantom of the Rue Morgue (1954) as Detective Mignaud (uncredited)
King Richard and the Crusaders (1954) as King Philip of France 
The Egyptian (1954) as Hittite Officer (uncredited)
Jupiter's Darling (1955) as Carthalo
Jump Into Hell (1955) as Maj. Lamblin (uncredited)
Lust for Life (1956) as Waiter (uncredited)
The Ten Commandments (1956) as Sheik of Sinai
The Shadow on the Window (1957) as Louie (uncredited)
Cry Tough (1959) as Mr. Fuente (uncredited)
The Adventures of Huckleberry Finn (1960) as Mate (uncredited)
Blueprint for Robbery (1961) as Preacher Doc
When the Clock Strikes (1961) as Cady
Tammy Tell Me True (1961) as Captain Armand
Island of Love (1963) (uncredited)
Strange Bedfellows (1965) as Sheik's Interpreter (uncredited)
The Family Jewels (1965) as Gasoline Truck Driver (uncredited)
McHale's Navy Joins the Air Force (1965) as NKVD deputy
Alice in Wonderland or What's a Nice Kid like You Doing in a Place like This? (1966, TV Movie) as Fred Flintstone (singing voice)
The Man Called Flintstone (1966) as Fred Flintstone (singing voice)
Made in Paris (1966) as Bartender (uncredited)
The Singing Nun (1966) as Truck Driver (uncredited)
Frankie and Johnny (1966) as Gypsy (uncredited)
Don't Worry, We'll Think of a Title (1966) as Professor Lerowski
Hook, Line & Sinker (1969) as Kenyon Hammercher
Which Way to the Front? (1970) as Gangster (uncredited)
The ABC Saturday Superstar Movie (1972, TV Movie) as Yogi's Ark Lark - Paw Rugg / First Truck Driver
C.H.O.M.P.S. (1979) as Monster (dog)
Modern Problems (1981) as Dubrovnik
Omnisphere (1983) as Neon City: Screen 1 voice (voice)
The Greatest Adventure: Stories from the Bible (1986, Video short, episode - Daniel and the Lion's Den)
The Jetsons Meet the Flintstones (1987, TV Movie) as Fred Flintstone
Beetle Bailey (1989, TV Movie) as Sgt. Snorkel
I Yabba-Dabba Do! (1993, TV Movie) as Fred Flintstone
Hollyrock-a-Bye Baby (1993, TV Movie) as Fred Flintstone
The 10th Annual Television Academy Hall of Fame (1994, TV Movie documentary) as himself
A Flintstones Christmas Carol (1994, TV Movie) as Fred Flintstone

Television

The Life of Riley (1949) - Delivery man
Terry and the Pirates *(1952) - Singdee (1952)
 The Adventures of Superman (1952) - Legbo/William Johnson
Official Detective (1957) - Reagan
Zorro (1958) - León (uncredited)
Peter Gunn (1958) - Vladimir
Gunsmoke (1958) - Butler
 Richard Diamond, Private Detective (1958) - Turk Stell
Wagon Train (1958–1960) - Tex Hall, Black Feather, Phelan 
The Detectives (1960) - Roland Potter
Have Gun - Will Travel (1960) - Prince Alexei Romanov
Bonanza (1961) - Bookie
The Real McCoys (1961) - Mr. Ramirez
Mister Ed (1961) - The Great Mordini
Wagon Train (1961) - Frank
Straightaway (1962) – Episode "A Moment in the Sun" – Gabe
The Real McCoys (1962) - Pedro
Maverick (1962) - Professor Reynard
Mister Ed (1963) - Episode "Taller Than She" - The Blacksmith
Bob Hope Presents the Chrysler Theatre (1963)
The New Phil Silvers Show (1964) – Episode "Keep Cool" – Gomez
Jonny Quest (1964–65) - Various
The Flintstones (1964–66) - Baron Von Rickenrock, Additional voices
The Secret Squirrel Show (1965) - Additional voices
I Dream of Jeannie (1965) - Jeannie's Father
Rawhide (1965) - Gen. Velasquez
Hogan's Heroes (1965) - General Von Kaplow
The Atom Ant Show (1965–66) - Paw Rugg
Family Affair (1966) - Alam
Bewitched (1966) - Muldoon
Daniel Boone (1966) - Peter Mornay
The John Forsythe Show (1966) - Count Beppo
Hogan's Heroes (1966) - Antonovich
The Monkees (1966–67) - Babbit
Fantastic Four (1967) - Attuma, Molecule Man
The F.B.I. (1967) - Organ Grinder
The Monkees (1967) - Blauner
It Takes a Thief (1968) - Director
Hogan's Heroes (1968) - Blue Baron
The Bob Hope Specials (1968–1971)
Get Smart (1969) - Big Eddie Little
Get Smart (1969) - Mondo
The Banana Splits Adventures Hour (1969) - Bez
Harlem Globetrotters (1970) - Additional voices (uncredited)
Ironside (1970) - Lecturer
The Mary Tyler Moore Show (1970) - Charlie's voice
Hogan's Heroes (1971) - Dr. von Bornemann
The Barkleys (1972) - Arnie Barkley
The Mary Tyler Moore Show (1972) - Harry
The New Scooby-Doo Movies (1972–1973) Redcoat Ghost, Additional voices
Josie and the Pussycats in Outer Space (1972) - Additional Voices
Yogi's Gang (1973) - Paw Rugg, Dr. Bigot
Butch Cassidy and the Sundance Kids (1973) - Additional Voices
The Brady Bunch (1973) - Mr. Haskell
The Streets of San Francisco (1974) - Weiss
These Are the Days (1974) - Additional Voices
Return to the Planet of the Apes (1975) - Main Title Voice-Over, General Urko, Tallyho the Hunter
 Harry O (1975) - Sidney Hacktel 
The Tom and Jerry/Grape Ape/Mumbly Show (1976) - Additional voices
The Tom and Jerry/Mumbly Show (1976–77) - Additional voices
The Scooby-Doo/Dynomutt Hour (1976) - Mr. Hyde/Willie the Weasel/The Prophet
The Mumbly Cartoon Show (1977) - Additional voices
Energy: A National Issue (1977) - Fred Flintstone (Singing voice)
Captain Caveman and the Teen Angels (1977–80) - Additional voices
CB Bears (1977) - Bump
Fred Flintstone and Friends (1977–78) - Fred Flintstone
Scooby's All-Star Laff-A-Lympics (1977) - Fred Flintstone
The Skatebirds (1977) - Additional Voices
A Flintstone Christmas (1977) - Fred Flintstone
Hanna-Barbera's All-Star Comedy Ice Revue (1978) - Fred Flintstone
The Three Robonic Stooges (1978) - Hercules, Pierre LeSly
The Flintstones: Little Big League (1978) - Fred Flintstone
Dynomutt, Dog Wonder (1978) - Mr. Hyde, Willie the Weasel, The Prophet
The New Fantastic Four (1978) - Attuma
Challenge of the Super Friends (1978) - Dr. Varga, Brain Creature Leader, Torahna
Yogi's Space Race (1978) - Sheriff Muletrain Pettigrew
Galaxy Goof-Ups (1978) - Additional voices
Buford and the Galloping Ghost (1979) - Sheriff Muletrain Pettigrew
The New Fred and Barney Show (1979) - Fred Flintstone
Welcome Back, Kotter (1979) - Sidney Fishbein
Hollywood Squares (1979) - Guest Appearance
The Flintstones Meet Rockula and Frankenstone (1979) - Fred Flintstone
Fred and Barney Meet the Thing (1979) - Fred Flintstone
Fred and Barney Meet the Shmoo (1979–1980) - Fred Flintstone
Mighty Man and Yukk (1979) - Goldteeth, Kragg the Conqueror
Fangface and Fangpuss (1979) - episode - The Defiant Casablanca Giant - Abdul the Giant
Super Friends (1980) - Additional voices
Thundarr the Barbarian (1980–81) - Ookla the Mok
The Fonz and the Happy Days Gang (1980) - Additional Voices
The Flintstone Comedy Show (1980–82) - Fred Flintstone
The Flintstones' New Neighbors (1980) - Fred Flintstone
The Flintstones: Fred's Final Fling (1980) - Fred Flintstone, Monkey #2, Turtle #2
Spider-Man (1981) - Johann's Father
Goldie Gold and Action Jack (1981) - Additional voices
The Kwicky Koala Show (1981) - Additional voices
No Man's Valley (1981) - Chief
The Richie Rich/Scooby-Doo Show (1981) - Additional voices
The Flintstones: Wind-Up Wilma (1981) - Fred Flintstone
The Flintstones: Jogging Fever (1981) - Fred Flintstone
Jokebook (1982) - Additional voices
Yogi Bear's All Star Comedy Christmas Caper (1982) - Fred Flintstone, Policeman, Security Guard #1
Here Comes Garfield (1982) - Hubert
The Flintstone Funnies (1982–84) - Fred Flintstone
Alvin and the Chipmunks (1983) - Additional Voices
Mister T (1983) - Additional voices
The New Scooby and Scrappy-Doo Show (1983) - Additional voices
Strong Kids, Safe Kids (1984) - Fred Flintstone
Challenge of the GoBots (1984) - Additional voices
Scary Scooby Funnies (1984–85) - Additional voices
Galtar and the Golden Lance (1985)  - Additional voices
The Berenstain Bears Show (1985) - Additional Male voices
The Jetsons (1985) - Elroy in Wonderland
The Flintstones' 25th Anniversary Celebration (1986) - Fred Flintstone
The Flintstone Kids (1986–87) - Edna Flintstone, Ed Flintstone
The Video Adventures of Clifford the Big Red Dog (1988) - Various voices
The Flintstone Kids' "Just Say No" Special (1988) - Ed Flintstone, Edna Flintstone
Hanna-Barbera's 50th: A Yabba Dabba Doo Celebration (1989) - Fred Flintstone
A Flintstone Family Christmas (1993) - Fred Flintstone
The Simpsons (1994) - Fred Flintstone
Garfield and Friends (1994) - Various voices
The Flintstones: Wacky Inventions (1994) - Fred Flintstone
Dino: Stay Out! (1995) - Fred Flintstone
The Weird Al Show (1997) - Fred Flintstone

Video games
The Flintstones: Bedrock Bowling (2000) - Fred Flintstone

Theme parks
The Funtastic World of Hanna-Barbera (1990) - Fred Flintstone

References

External links

 
 
 

1920 births
2005 deaths
American male film actors
American male television actors
American male voice actors
American people of Romanian-Jewish descent
American people of Russian-Jewish descent
Burials at San Fernando Mission Cemetery
Canadian emigrants to the United States
Canadian male film actors
Canadian male television actors
Canadian male voice actors
Deaths from emphysema
Hanna-Barbera people
Male actors from Montreal
20th-century American male actors